Okram Ibobi Singh (born 19 June 1948) is an Indian Politician who served as the Chief Minister of Manipur from 2002 to 2017. In 2012, he helped his party win the state election for the third time with an absolute majority securing 42 out of the total 60 assembly seats, brushing aside anti-incumbency factor once again.
He is a member of the Indian National Congress. In 2017 Assembly Elections, Okram Ibobi Singh defeated Leitanthem Basanta Singh and Irom Sharmila.

Early life
Okram Ibobi Singh was born to Okram Angoubi and Lukamani Devi to a Meitei Hindu family at Athokpam, Thoubal district. He is the oldest child and has five brothers and three sisters. He was born to a poor family and helped with his father's profession. He did his graduation from D.M. College, Imphal. He is married to L. Landhoni Devi, who has won two consecutive elections of Manipur Legislative Assembly from Khangabok Constituency of Thoubal district. She is also the first woman MLA of Thoubal district.

Assassination attempt

In November 2006, Okram Ibobi Singh's residence was attacked by the terrorist  organization - People's Revolutionary Party of Kangleipak (PREPAK).

On 2 September 2008, militants again attacked Shri Ibobi's official residence at Babupara, Imphal while he was sleeping. One security guard was injured in the attack, but Singh was unharmed.  A member of the PREPAK claimed responsibility for the attack via phone, and indicated it was meant as a warning to Singh to stop policies meant to thwart the insurgency in Manipur.

Controversy
In a September 2006 confidential cable released by WikiLeaks, Henry V. Jardine, Principal Officer, U.S. Consulate General, Kolkata, reported the Chief Minister as "Mr. Ten Percent" for the amount of money he takes from contracts and government projects.

References

External links
 Manipur State Government Portal

|-

1948 births
Living people
Indian National Congress politicians from Manipur
Meitei people
Manipur politicians
Chief Ministers of Manipur
People from Thoubal district
Chief ministers from Indian National Congress
Manipur MLAs 2017–2022
Manipur MLAs 2022–2027
Manipur MLAs 2002–2007